HMAS Sea Snake was an auxiliary  junk built for the Royal Australian Navy during the Second World War. She was launched in 1945 and commissioned into the Royal Australian Navy on 31 March 1945. She was used by the Services Reconnaissance Department and was paid off on 27 November 1945, before being handed over to the British Civil Administration in Borneo.

Notes

References

Further reading

Snake-class junks
1945 ships
Ships built in Victoria (Australia)